Relations between Greece and Turkey began in the 1830s following Greece's formation after its declaration of independence from the Ottoman Empire. Modern relations began when Turkey declared its formation in 1923 following the defeat of the Ottoman Empire in World War I.

Greece and Turkey have a rivalry with a history of events that have been used to justify their nationalism. These events include the population exchange between Greece and Turkey, the Istanbul pogrom and Cypriot intercommunal violence. Greek-Turkish feuding was not a significant factor in international relations from 1930 to 1955, and during the Cold War, domestic and bipolar politics limited competitive behaviour against each other. By the mid-1990s and later decades, these restraints on their rivalry was removed, and both nations had become each other's biggest security risk.

Control of the eastern Mediterranean and Aegean seas remain the basis of the countries' rivalry. Following the end of World War II, the UNCLOS treaty, the decolonisation of Cyprus, and the addition of the Dodecanese to Greece's territory have caused turbulence in the relationship. Several issues frequently affect their current relations, including territorial disputes over the sea and air, minority rights, and Turkey's relationship with the European Union (EU) and its member states—especially Cyprus. Control of energy pipelines is also an increasing focus in their relations.

Diplomatic missions

The first official diplomatic contact between Greece and the Ottoman Empire occurred in 1830. Consular relations between the two countries were established in 1834. In 1853, a Greek embassy was opened in Constantinople; this was discontinued during periods of crisis and eventually transferred to the new capital Ankara in 1923 when the Republic of Turkey was formed.

Turkey's missions in Greece include its embassy in Athens and consulates general in Thessaloniki, Komotini and Rhodes. Greece's missions in Turkey include its embassy in Ankara, and consulates general in Istanbul, İzmir and Edirne.

History

Background

The histories of the Byzantine Empire and Ottoman Empire factor into modern relations between Turkey and Greece. Anthony Kaldellis views the Byzantine Empire as the medieval expression of a Greek nation and a pre-modern nation state. There is a debate that Turkey is not a successor state but the legal continuation of the Ottoman Empire as a republic.

The Greek presence in Asia Minor dates to the Late Bronze Age (1450 BC) or earlier. The Göktürks of the First Turkic Khaganate was the first Turkic state to politically use the name Türk. The first contact with the Roman Byzantine Empire is believed to have occurred in AD 563. In the 10th century, the Seljuk Turks rose to power. Later, Turkish Anatolian beyliks were established in former Byzantine lands and in the territory of the fragmenting Seljuk Sultanate. One of those beyliks was the Ottoman dynasty, which became the Ottoman Empire. In 1453, the Ottoman Empire conquered Constantinople, the capital city of the Byzantine Empire.

Modern Greece came under Ottoman rule in the 15th century. During the following centuries, there were sporadic but unsuccessful Greek uprisings against Ottoman rule. Greek nationalism started to appear in the 18th century. In March 1821. the Greek War of Independence began.

Greece and the Ottoman Empire relations: 1822–1923

Following the Greek War of Independence, Greece was formed as an independent state in 1830. Relations between Greece and the Ottoman Empire were shaped by the Eastern Question and the Megali Idea. Conflicts between the two countries include the Epirus Revolt of 1854 during the Crimean War, the 1878 Greek Macedonian rebellion and the Epirus Revolt of 1878 during the Russo-Turkish War (1877–1878). Wars between the Ottomans and the Greeks include the Greco-Turkish War (1897) and the two Balkan Wars. With the Allies' victory in World War I, Greece was awarded sovereignty over Western Thrace in the Treaty of Neuilly-sur-Seine; and Eastern Thrace and the Smyrna area in the Treaty of Sèvres. Greek gains were largely undone by the subsequent Greco-Turkish War (1919–1922).

Greece occupied Smyrna on 15 May 1919, while Mustafa Kemal Pasha (later Atatürk), who was to become the leader of the Turkish opposition to the Treaty of Sèvres, landed in Samsun on 19 May 1919, an action that is regarded as the beginning of the Turkish War of Independence. Pasha united the protesting voices in Anatolia and began a nationalist movement to repel the Allied armies that had occupied the Ottoman Empire and establish new borders for a sovereign Turkish nation. The Turkish nation would be Western in civilisation and would elevate Turkish culture that had faded under Arab culture; this included disassociating Islam from Arab culture and restricted it to the private sphere.

The Turkish Parliament in Ankara formally abolished the Sultanate and the Treaty of Lausanne (1923) ended all conflict and replaced previous treaties to constitute modern Turkey. The treaty provided for a population exchange between Greece and Turkey.

The treaty also contained a declaration of amnesty for the perpetrators of crimes that were committed between 1914 and 1922, a period which was marked by many atrocities. The Greek genocide was the systematic killing of the Christian-Ottoman Greek population of Anatolia which started before World War I, and continued during the war and its aftermath (1914–1922).

Initial relations between Greece and Turkey: 1923–1945 

Following the population exchange, Greece wanted to end hostilities but negotiations stalled because of the issue of valuations of the properties of the exchanged populations. Driven by Eleftherios Venizelos in co-operation with Mustafa Kemal Atatürk, as well as İsmet İnönü's government, a series of treaties between Greece and Turkey were signed in 1930, in effect restoring Greek-Turkish relations and establishing a de facto alliance between the two countries. As part of these treaties, Greece and Turkey agreed the Treaty of Lausanne would be the final settlement of their respective borders, pledged they would not join opposing military or economic alliances, and to immediately stop their naval arms race.

The Balkan Pact of 1934 was signed, in which Greece and Turkey joined Yugoslavia and Romania in a treaty of mutual assistance, and settled outstanding issues. Venizelos nominated Atatürk for the Nobel Peace Prize in 1934.

Greece was a signatory to a 1936 agreement that gives Turkey control over the Bosporus and Dardanelles Straits, and regulates the transit of naval warships. The nations signed the 1938 Salonika Agreement which abandoned the demilitarised zones along the Turkish border with Greece that were a result of the Treaty of Lausanne.

In 1941, due to Turkey's neutrality during the Second World War, Britain lifted the blockade and allowed shipments of grain from Turkey to relieve the great famine in Athens during the Axis occupation. Using the vessel SS Kurtuluş, foodstuffs were collected by a nationwide campaign of Kızılay, the Turkish Red Crescent, and the operation was funded by the American Greek War Relief Association and the Hellenic Union of Constantinopolitans.

During this period, the Greek minority that remained in Turkey faced discriminatory targeting. In 1941 in anticipation of the Second World War, in the Twenty Classes, adult male Armenians, Greeks and Jews were conscripted into labour battalions. In 1942, Turkey imposed the Varlık Vergisi, a special tax that heavily impacted the non-Muslim minorities of Turkey. Officially, the tax was devised to fill the state treasury that would have been needed if Germany or the Soviet Union invaded the country. The tax's main purpose, however, was to nationalise the Turkish economy by reducing minority populations' influence and control over the country's trade, finance, and industries.

Post World War II relations: 1945–1982 

Following the power vacuum left by the ending of the Axis occupation after the war, the Greek Civil War erupted as one of the first conflicts of the Cold War. It represented the first example of Cold War involvement on the part of the Allies in the internal affairs of a non-Allied country. Turkey was a focus for the Soviet Union due to foreign control of the straits; it was a central reason for the outbreak of the Cold War  In 1950, both Greece and Turkey fought in the Korean War, ending Turkey's diplomatic isolation and brought it an invitation to join the North Atlantic Treaty Organization (NATO); in 1952, both countries joined NATO; and in 1953, Greece, Turkey and Yugoslavia formed a new Balkan Pact for mutual defence against the Soviet Union.

According to think tank Geopolitical Futures, three events contributed to the deterioration of post-1945 bilateral relations:

After the defeat of Italy in the Second World War, the long-standing issue of sovereignty over the Dodecanese archipelago, which had been a sore point since the Venizelos–Tittoni agreement between Greece and Italy, was resolved to Greece's favour in 1946, upsetting Turkey because it changed the balance of power. Turkey renounced claims to the Dodecanese in the Treaty of Lausanne but future administrations wanted them for security reasons, and possibly due to the Cyprus issue.
After the decolonisation of Cyprus, conflict between Greeks and Turks broke out on the island. In the 1950s, the pursuit of enosis became a part of Greece's national policy. Taksim became the slogan by some Turkish Cypriots in reaction to enosis. Tensions between Greece and Turkey increased, and the ambivalence towards Cyprus by the Greek government of George Papandreou led to the Greek military coup. In 1974, the Greek government staged a coup against the Cypriot president and Archbishop Makarios by invading Cyprus and establishing a Greece-controlled Cyprus government. Soon after, Turkey—using its guarantor status arising from the trilateral accords of the 1959–1960 Zürich and London Agreement—invaded Cyprus. The Turkish Federated State of Cyprus was declared one year later. 
Starting in 1958 and expanded in 1982 for the issue of territorial waters, the U.N. Convention on the Law of the Sea (UNCLOS) replaced the older concept of freedom of the seas, which dated from the 17th century. According to this concept, national rights were limited to a specified belt of water extending from a nation's coastlines, usually —known as the three-mile limit. By 1967, only 30 nations still used the old three-nautical-mile convention. It was ratified by Greece in 1972 but Turkey has not ratified it, asking for a bilateral solution since 1974 which uses the mid-line of the Aegean instead

In 1955, the Adnan Menderes government is believed to have orchestrated the Istanbul pogrom, which targeted the city's substantial Greek ethnic minority and other minorities. In September 1955, a bomb exploded close to the Turkish consulate in Greece's second-largest city Thessaloniki, also damaging the Atatürk Museum, site of Atatürk's birthplace, breaking some windows but causing little other damage. In retaliation, in Istanbul, thousands of shops, houses, churches and graves belonging to members of the ethnic Greek minority were destroyed within a few hours, over 12 people were killed and many more injured. The ongoing struggle between Turkey and Greece over control of Cyprus, and Cypriot intercommunal violence, were concurrent with the pogrom. Pressure over the resulting London Conference to discuss Cyprus, and to direct attention away from the domestic political problems were the likely motivation of the Turkish Menderes government.

In 1964, Turkish prime minister İsmet İnönü renounced the Greco-Turkish Treaty of Friendship of 1930 and took actions against the Greek minority. An estimated 50,000 Greeks were expelled. A 1971 Turkish law nationalised religious high schools and closed the Halki seminary on Istanbul's Heybeli Island, an issue that affects 21st-century relations.

Contemporary history and issues

Military and diplomatic tensions 
Towards the end of the 20th century, there were several high profile incidents between the countries. In 1986 by the border at the Evros River, a Greek soldier was shot dead. In 1987, the Turkish survey ship Sismik 1 nearly triggered a war. In 1995, a military crisis erupted over an uninhabited island called Imia, over which both countries claim sovereignty.

Lesser incidents where both side exchange fire often occur. This creates volatility when relations are tense and the risk of starting war.

In the 1990s, Greece pursued a policy of encircling Turkey. Following the breakup of Yugoslavia, both Greece and Turkey viewed each other with suspicion as they developed relations with the new countries. In 1995, however, this fear materialised. Greece formed a defence co-operation agreement with Syria, and between 1995 and 1998 established good relations with Turkey's other neighbours Iran and Armenia. In reaction, Turkey spoke with Israel in 1996, which caused uproar in Arab countries.

Dr. R. Craig Nation of the United States Army War College views the conflict between the nations as a fight for control over the Aegean Sea and the eastern Mediterranean.

Positive relations 

 
In 1995, relations began to change with the Greek election of Kostas Simitis who redefined priorities but it wasn't until the meeting of the foreign ministers the following years that this was noticed. In 1998, the capture of the Kurdish separatist Abdullah Öcalan– on the way from the Greek embassy in Kenya – and the related fallout led to the Greek foreign minister resigning, whose replacement was with a strong supporter for discussions with Turkey. The 1999 İzmit earthquake followed by the 1999 Athens earthquake led to an outpouring of goodwill and what has been called earthquake diplomacy that aided in a change of relations.

In the years that followed, relations improved. They included agreements on fighting organised crime, reducing military spending, preventing illegal immigration, and clearing land mines on the border. Additionally, Greece lifted its opposition to Turkey's accession to the European Union (EU). Dr R. Craig Nation states there was a lot of progress but ultimately not on the issues that mattered.

The Aegean and Eastern Mediterranean conflicts 

The conflict between Turkey and Greece is largely over whether the Greek islands are allowed an exclusive economic zone, the basis of claiming rights over the sea. Some claim fear of sovereignty loss is what is driving this conflict. Under Recep Tayyip Erdoğan, the Blue Homeland policy of Turkey has emerged. Islands and islets Iying within  of the coast were included as part of the respective state under the Treaty of Lausanne. The conference for the UN sea treaty UNCLOS defined territorial waters in 1982 and came into force in 1994.

There are 168 nations as signatories of the treaty, including Greece but not Turkey. Turkey disputes Greece can claim 12 miles off the coast of its islands, which the sea treaty permits, implying only the mainland has this right, otherwise it would give Greece dominant control of the Aegean. Turkey has made a claim for the economic zone by splitting the Aegean Sea in the middle. The EU requires membership of the sea treaty as a condition.

There has been an extension of the conflict with other nations in the Mediterranean. In 2019 and 2022, Turkey made deals with Libya to extend its economic rights over the sea, which were countered with Greece and Egypt.

The Cyprus dispute created a subsequent military build up. The dispute escalated with Greece's coup in Cyprus, which led to the Turkish invasion of Cyprus. In 1974, Greece reacted with the militarisation of the Greek islands off the coast of Turkey, the legality of which is challenged by Turkey. In 1975, Turkey created Izmir army base.  Military buildups in 2022 have continued.

Cyprus and the EU 

Greece has been a member of the EU since 1981. Cyprus joined in 2004. Turkey submitted its application to join in 1987 and became a full candidate in 1999.

Until 1999, Greece concentrated its diplomatic efforts on barring Turkey's admission to the EU. Concerns about Turkey included its human rights record and Greece's veto ultimately had Turkey disregarded by the EU. In Turkey, this contributed to the shift away from Turkey's founding secular doctrine Kemalism and the rise of political Islam. There was a change to the Kemalism amnesia of the Ottoman Empire's past, which instead became a source of pride and identity for Turkey. Kemalism evolved to an alternative identity of European orientation as Turkey became a regional centre in the emerging Eurasian political formation.

In the 1990s, friction around Turkey's EU accession involving Cyprus was paralleled by military tensions between Turkey and Greece. In 1994, Greece and Cyprus agreed on a security doctrine that would mean any Turkish military action in Cyprus would cause war with Greece. In 1997, Cyprus purchased two Soviet-era S-300 missile systems, resulting in a political standoff between Cyprus and Turkey. Negotiations on the division on the island in the 1990s failed because of the Turkish side's recognition of North Cyprus as an independent state, an issue that remains as of 2022. When Cyprus joined the EU in 2002, negotiations on Turkey's accession stalled due to Cyprus's veto on the matter.

Turkey's migrant crisis has also had a big effect on its relationship with the EU. The enforcement of the arms embargo against Libya Operation Irini brought other EU members into conflict with Turkey. Gas drilling on territory disputed with Greece using research vessel RV MTA Oruç Reis led to EU sanctions against Turkey.

Energy pipelines 

The 2010 discovery of natural gas deposits in the eastern Mediterranean, first by Israel and then Egypt, has increased tensions between Greece and Turkey. The region is estimated to contain 5% of the world's known natural gas reserves. Historical security issues of the Aegean and Cyprus are important for resolving Europe's energy needs. The 2016 Turkey-Israel reconciliation led to Greece sabotaging the 2017 Cyprus-UN talks to reunify the island, preventing Israel and Turkey from developing a gas pipeline. In 2019, the east Mediterranean gas forum was created, including seven countries but excluding Turkey.

The region is considered the end-point for east–west pipelines. In 2007, the countries inaugurated the Greek-Turkish natural gas pipeline, giving gas from the Caspian Sea its first direct Western outlet. The Caspian Sea is one of the oldest oil-producing regions; it is estimated to have reserves of 48 billion barrels, and 292 trillion cubic feet of natural gas. The opening of these fields followed more than 20 years of negotiation following the 2018 convention on the legal status of the Caspian Sea. Outside of the Caspian Sea nations, there are other suppliers that wish to leverage the geographical positioning of the nations. In May 2022, Greece signed a deal with Turkey's rival the United Arab Emirates for the distribution of the UAE's liquefied natural gas.

Minority rights 

The treaty of Lausanne provided for the protection of the Greek Orthodox Christian minority in Turkey and the Muslim minority in Greece.

Minorities in both countries since have been affected by the state of relations between them. Minorities are used as leverage, using the principle of reciprocity. In the 1960s, Turkey pressured the Greek minority in Turkey when the Cyprus issue escalated. Turkey used the election of Muftis by the Muslim Turkish minority in Greece as a condition for opening Halki Seminary which was closed in 1971. As a reaction in 1972, Greece closed a Turkish school in Rhodes. In recent years, Turkey has used its cultural heritage, such as Sumela Monastery, to achieve political ends.

Examples of minority mistreatment include:
 During World War II, Turkey nationalised its industry and imposed the Varlık Vergisi, a discriminatory wealth tax that targeted minorities.
 Turkey blamed Greeks for Turkey's economic problems, resulting in the Istanbul pogrom.
 In 1967, the Greek military government deported Turkish citizens on the Dodecanese peninsula.
 In 1955, Greece's Article 19 of the Nationality Code established two classes of Greek citizens; those of "non-Greek descent" lost their citizenship if they left the country. By the time of its abolition in 1998, 60,000 people had lost their citizenship and the abolition had no retroactive effect.

The election of Muftis in Greece and the reopening of the Halki Seminary in Turkey have become the most prominent issues. Issues around political authority and pre-conditions contribute to the stalemate. Former Greek prime minister George Papandreou has said Turkey and Greece would benefit if they treated minorities as citizens rather than foreigners.

Migrants 

Turkey has become a transit country for people entering Europe. In 2015, the route that passes from Turkey to Greece and then through the Balkan countries became the most-used route for migrants escaping conflicts in the Middle East and North Africa, with irregular migration from further East continuing. Turkey assumed the role of guardian of the Schengen Area, protecting it from irregular migration. This, combined with Turkey's migrant crisis, has resulted in illegal migration being a key issue between Turkey and the EU. People moving across the border of Greece and Turkey are a frequent cause of incidents between the two countries.

In 2016, the EU and Turkey reached a deal on the migrant crisis. There was some success with the four-year agreement extended to 2022, but several incidents have occurred. In 2019, the Greek government warned a new migrant crisis similar to the previous one would occur.

Turkish insurgents and asylum seekers

During the 2010 trial of those accused of organising a 2003 alleged military coup attempt in Turkey called Sledgehammer, the conspirators were accused of planning attacks on mosques, triggering a conflict with Greece by Turkey shooting down one of its own warplanes and then accusing Greeks of this and planting bombs in Istanbul to initiate a military takeover.

Greece has on many occasions arrested members of the DHKP-C who planned attacks in Turkey. Turkey has accused Greece of supporting terrorists such as the DHKP-C.

Turkey has seen a slide to authoritarianism resulting in Turkish refugees becoming more common, like politician Leyla Birlik accused of insulting the president. This has increased since the failed 2016 Turkish coup d'état attempt, after which 995 people, including military personnel, applied for asylum. More than 1,800 Turkish citizens requested asylum in Greece in 2017, including those who plotted the assassination. Sometimes, this causes tensions between the nations in other areas.

Timeline

See also

History of Greece
History of Turkey
History of Cyprus
Hellenoturkism
Foreign relations of Greece, Turkey, Cyprus and Northern Cyprus
European Union–Turkey relations
Greece–Turkey border
Intermediate Region
Greeks in Turkey
Greeks in the Middle East
Turks in Greece 
Turks in Europe
Greece–Turkey football rivalry

Notes

References

Further reading

External links
Turkish PM on landmark Greek trip
Greece-Turkey boundary study by Florida State University, College of Law
Greece's Shifting Position on Turkish Accession to the EU Before and After Helsinki (1999)
Turkish Ministry of Foreign Affairs about the relations with Greece
Greek Ministry of Foreign Affairs about the relations with Turkey

 
Turkey
Bilateral relations of Turkey
Relations of colonizer and former colony